Ternovoye is a rural locality (a settlement) in Grishevskoye Rural Settlement, Podgorensky District, Voronezh Oblast, Russia. The population was 220 as of 2010. There are 2 streets.

Geography 
Ternovoye is located 35 km northwest of Podgorensky (the district's administrative centre) by road. Grigoryevka is the nearest rural locality.

References 

Rural localities in Podgorensky District